Ichiko (written: 一子, 市子, 伊知子, 以知子 or イチコ in katakana) is a feminine Japanese given name. Notable people with the name include:

, Japanese singer-songwriter
, Japanese singer-songwriter
, Japanese musician, composer and singer
, Japanese volleyball player
, Japanese journalist, feminist, writer, translator, and critic.
, Japanese J-Pop singer who was part of the group Aurora Gonin Musume

Fictional characters
, a character in the anime OVA Munto
, protagonist of the manga series Binbō-gami ga!
Ichiko Yagura, a character in the horror video game Forbidden Siren 2
Ichiko Ohya, a character in the video game Persona 5

Japanese feminine given names